LaMark Anthony Baker (born November 11, 1969) is a retired American basketball player and current coach. He is the former head coach of the Dayton Jets of the International Basketball League.

He played collegiately for the Ohio State University as point guard from 1989–1992. He is currently third in all-time assists in Ohio State history.

After graduating, he was not drafted and signed with the National Basketball Association's Charlotte Hornets, but was waived before the 1992–93 season started. Baker played two seasons in the Continental Basketball Association (CBA) for the Columbus Horizon (1992–93) and the Grand Rapids Hoops (1998–99), averaging 10.6 points and 7.2 assists per game for his CBA career.  He played one game for the Toronto Raptors in the 1999 season. He also played professionally in Italy in Serie A2 for Bini Viaggi Livorno (1997–98). In 2001, he played for the Florida Sea Dragons of the USBL.

References

External links 
 Mark Baker Foundation

1969 births
Living people
Basketball coaches from Ohio
American expatriate basketball people in Canada
American expatriate basketball people in Croatia
American expatriate basketball people in Italy
American men's basketball players
Basketball players from Dayton, Ohio
Columbus Horizon players
Grand Rapids Hoops players
KK Cibona players
Ohio State Buckeyes men's basketball players
Parade High School All-Americans (boys' basketball)
Point guards
Toronto Raptors players
Undrafted National Basketball Association players
United States Basketball League players